Orbit Culture is a Swedish melodic death metal band from Eksjö, formed in 2013. The band includes vocalist/guitarist Niklas Karlsson, guitarist Richard Hansson, bassist Fredrik Lennartsson, and drummer Christopher Wallerstedt. Former band members are lead guitarist Maximilian Zinsmeister, bassist Christoffer Olsson and drummer Markus Bladh. The band has released three studio albums and three EPs.

History

Formation (2013) 
Orbit Culture was formed with the idea of the vocalist and rhythm guitarist Niklas Karlsson and ex-guitarist Maximilian Zinsmeister. They met each other through mutual friends at the age of 17 and decided to create a small group. They hired a small rehearsal place in an old power plant station. At that time, Maximilian was currently playing with another local band called Abstract Noise and he recruited Orbit Culture's fellow drummer Markus Bladh and later, Christoffer Olsson joined to play bass guitar.

Odyssey (2013) 
Shortly after the band's formation, Karlsson started to write songs for their debut EP and the band spent most of the summer of 2013 recording, mixing, and producing their first set of songs, Odyssey. The production ended on 17 August 2013, and Odyssey was released shortly after. In December that year, the band released the remastered version of their EP with new artwork and the instrumental versions of the songs. The band and their EP gained local interest and they performed their first shows in their hometown.

In Medias Res (2014) 
After positive feedback towards Odyssey, the band started production on their first full-length album and released In Medias Res on 23 July 2014. They released a music video for the song "Obscurity" on 31 October 2014.

Maximilian's departure and Rasen (2016) 
After promoting In Medias Res through multiple live shows, Zinsmeister decided to leave the band shortly after to focus on his academic studies. The band had teased on social media images and videos of them working on a second full-length album, and on 11 March 2016, their second full-length album Rasen was released. On 25 August 2016, the band released their second music video "Sun of All", which has reached almost 600,000 plays on YouTube. Karlsson commented that things started to heat up in the underground metal community for them after this video.

Olsson's departure and the replacements (2016) 
Christoffer Olsson decided to leave the band in the late summer of 2016, on account of his studies at university. Concurrently, two new members joined the band; Fredrik Lennartsson on bass guitar and Richard Hansson (Bash Brothers, Straight A's) on lead guitar.

Redfog (2018) 
On 8 March 2018, Orbit Culture teased and released the single "Saw". Karlsson revealed plans for an EP titled Redfog, which was released on 6 April 2018. Two more singles were released from the EP before release, "See Through Me" and "Redfog". All three songs were a commercial success as they all have over a million streams on multiple platforms. In 2019, Karlsson revealed they were writing a studio album under Seek & Strike Records.

Markus's departure and his replacement (2019) 
On 11 March 2019, Orbit Culture announced that Markus Bladh felt that the time and effort that the band needed was too much for him and he had decided to leave. Shortly after, they introduced Christopher Wallerstedt as their new drummer who was friends with Richard.

First tour (2019) 
In 2019, the band's first booking agency Avocado Booking set them up on their first tour with Rivers of Nihil, Black Crown Initiate and MOL. On 20 September, the band played their first ever show outside Sweden at Cassiopeia, Berlin on the Rivers of Nihil Tour.

Nija (2020) 
The band released the first single "Nensha" through Seek & Strike on the same day of their first live show. On 26 February 2020, they released another single and music video called "Rebirth". On 27 March, they released the track "The Shadowing" to finalize the trilogy. The band released their full album Nija on 7 August 2020 and received multiple positive reviews for the record.
Karlsson commented on Nija that: "You can expect a fist on your skull that forces you to the ground and exhausts you to ask for more." The deluxe edition of the album was released on 15 January 2021 and included two bonus tracks.
They performed a live stream show for the album at Knotfest: Pulse of the Maggots Live Streaming Festival on 13 November 2020. Karlsson has stated his own interests in bands like Metallica, Gojira and Behemoth helped inspire him. He also mentioned: "this album has been the hardest and most difficult set of songs I've ever worked with."

Shaman (2021) 
On 24 September 2021, the band released their third EP titled Shaman. Karlsson stated that the track "A Sailor's Tale" was inspired by the song "Master of Puppets" by Metallica.

Upcoming tours 
The band was forced to cancel all of their upcoming shows of 2020 due to the pandemic of COVID-19 but they recently announced that they'll be heading out on an EU/UK tour with Thy Art Is Murder, MALEVOLENCE, KING 810, and Alpha Wolf at the end 2021.
They were also set to play at John Smith Rock Festival in July 2021, which was also later canceled due to the pandemic.
Karlsson had an interview with Dead Press about his and the band's future plans. He mentioned he already had around 40 song ideas and that the band is working on new material.
On 27 September 2021, the band announced that the United Talent Agency is now their booking agency worldwide.

Members

Current 
 Niklas Karlsson – lead vocals, rhythm guitar (2013–present)
 Richard Hansson – lead guitar (2016–present)
 Fredrik Lennartsson – bass (2016–present)
 Christopher Wallerstedt – drums (2019–present)

Former  
 Christoffer Olsson – bass (2013–2016)
 Maximilian Zinsmeister – lead guitar (2013–2016)
 Markus Bladh – drums (2013–2019)

Timeline

Discography 

Studio albums
 In Medias Res (2014)
 Rasen (2016)
 Nija (2020)

EPs
 Odyssey (2013)
 Redfog (2018)
 Shaman (2021)
 Descent (2023)

References

External links 
 
 
 

Swedish melodic death metal musical groups
Musical quartets
Groove metal musical groups